Glinje may refer to:

Glinje, Braslovče, in Slovenia
Glinje, Cerklje na Gorenjskem, in Slovenia
Glinje, a community in Ugljevik, Bosnia and Herzegovina